The 2000–01 Ukrainian Hockey League season was the eighth season of the Ukrainian Hockey League, the top level of ice hockey in Ukraine. 14 teams participated in the league, and HC Berkut won the championship.

First round

Central

East

South

Second round

Playoffs
Semifinals
HC Sokil Kyiv 13 - HC Kharkiv 0
HC Berkut 5 - Politechnik Yasya Kyiv 0
Final
HC Berkut 2 - HC Sokil Kyiv 1
3rd place
Politechnika Yasya Kyiv 5 - HC Kharkiv 0

External links
2000-01 Standings and results. Ukrainian Ice Hockey Federation

UKHL
Ukrainian Hockey Championship seasons
Ukr
2001 in Ukrainian sport